The men's 3000 metres steeplechase event at the 2011 Summer Universiade was held on 17–20 August.

Medalists

Results

Heats
Qualification: First 4 in each heat (Q) and the next 4 fastest (q) qualified for the final.

Final

References
Heats results
Final results

3000
2011